Santa Terezinha Municipal Airport  is the airport serving Joaçaba, Brazil.

History
The airport was commissioned in May 1949.

Airlines and destinations
No scheduled flights operate at this airport.

Access

See also

List of airports in Brazil

References

External links

Airports in Santa Catarina (state)
Airports established in 1949